Maurice Holmes Rees (April 27, 1880 – May 25, 1945) was American medical educator who served as Dean of the University of Colorado School of Medicine and Superintendent of the University of Colorado Hospital from 1920 to 1945.

Early life and education 
Maurice Holmes Rees was born on April 27, 1880 in Newton, Iowa to Spencer Harris Rees and Margaret Holmes. He attended Newton High School and served in the Iowa National Guard from 1889 to 1901, where he was honorably discharged.

He earned his Bachelor's of Arts at Monmouth College in 1904 and his Master's of Arts at the University of Illinois at Urbana–Champaign in 1905.  Rees earned his Doctor of Philosophy from the University of Chicago in 1917  and his Doctor of Medicine from Washington University in St. Louis in 1921

Academic career 
Rees held a multitude of academic positions throughout his career. He served as a professor of natural science at York College (Nebraska) (1905–1906,), a professor of biology at Tarkio College (1906–1914), an assistant professor in physiology at the University of Kansas (1914–1916) assistant professor in physiology at the University of Chicago (1916–1917) and a physiology professor at the University of South Dakota (1917–1921).    

From there he would join the University of Colorado Boulder as professor of physiology and pharmacology in 1921. He would go on to become head of the school's Department of Physiology and later dean at the University of Colorado School of Medicine in 1925. He would serve in the position for 20 years until his death in 1945.

For a year he served as president of the Association of American Medical Colleges (1930–1931).

Rees was member of the American Medical Association, the American College of Hospital Administrators, the American Physiological Society and the Denver Clinical and Pathological Society.

Select publications 

 The Influence of Pituitary Extracts on the Daily Output of Urine (January 22, 1918) The American Journal of Physiology
The Influence of Pituitary Extracts on the Absorption of Water from the Small Intestine (May 12, 1920) The American Journal of Physiology
 The Use of Pituitary Extracts by Mouth in the Treatment if Diabetes Insipidus (January, 1922) Endocrinology: The Bulletin of the Association for the Society of Internal Secretions
 Relation of Physiology to Clinical Medicine (September 7, 1929) The Journal of the American Medical Association
 Effect of Digestive Enzymes on Pituitary Extract Action (June 1, 1923) The American Journal of Physiology

Personal life 
Rees was married to his wife Elizabeth M. Prather on June 21, 1911 in Tarkio, Missouri. The couple had one son together named Maurice Prather Rees.

Death and legacy 
Rees died from coronary artery disease at the age of 64 on May 25, 1945 in Denver, Colorado. His body was cremated at Fairmount Crematorium and his ashes given to his wife, Elizabeth.

In his honor, the Regents of the University of Colorado established the Dean Maurice H. Rees Scholarship Fund. The scholarship is to be awarded to a single student each year who is entering the junior class of the school of medicine and "has shown, in addition to excellent scholarship during his first two years, those fine qualities of character and conscientious devotion to duty manifested by Dean Rees during his life time".

References 

1880 births
1945 deaths
University of Illinois Urbana-Champaign alumni
People from Newton, Iowa
University of Colorado Boulder faculty
Monmouth College alumni
University of Chicago alumni
Washington University School of Medicine alumni
University of Chicago faculty
University of Kansas faculty
University of South Dakota faculty
20th-century American academics